Cyrtomium fortunei, also known by its common name Fortune's holly-fern, is a species from the genus Cyrtomium. This plant was first described by John Smith. It has gained the Royal Horticultural Society's Award of Garden Merit.

References

Dryopteridaceae
Flora of Malta